Beal Aerospace was a launch vehicle development company founded in February 1997 by Andrew Beal, president of Beal Bank in Dallas, Texas. Headquartered in Frisco, Texas, the goal of the company was to build and operate a privately developed heavy lift orbital launch vehicle. It ceased operations on October 23, 2000.

Company history
After being founded in 1997, employment grew to approximately 200 people at the company's peak in late 1999. A rocket engine test facility was successfully established in McGregor, Texas. There, the company conducted liquid-fueled engine tests, added several buildings, and built a vertical test stand. Ambitious plans were made to establish a launch pad on Sombrero Island in Anguilla, and to mass-produce launch vehicles in the Virgin Islands, but environmentalists were fiercely opposed to these development plans.

On March 4, 2000, Beal Aerospace conducted a successful test firing of the BA-2 rocket engine, the largest since the NASA Apollo program.

Following NASA's announcement that they would fund research and development of competing launch vehicles under the Space Launch Initiative (SLI), Andrew Beal announced on October 23, 2000, that Beal Aerospace would cease operations. Beal cited NASA's commercial practices as the primary reason for closing.

Launch vehicles
Beal Aerospace initially considered a rocket that used kerosene and liquid oxygen, but soon switched to kerosene fuel in combination with high  concentration hydrogen peroxide oxidizer. This combination was selected in order to avoid the expense and complexity of cryogenic storage, and to reduce development costs. Kerosene was injected into the hot steam and oxygen exhaust products of catalytically decomposed hydrogen peroxide, resulting in spontaneous ignition. The original BA-1 launch vehicle design was intended to service the LEO (Low Earth Orbit) satellite constellation launch market, but was replaced by the much larger BA-2 design when it was decided to concentrate on the more stable Geostationary satellite launch market as the LEO constellations became financially unsound. All three stages of the BA-2 vehicle were to be pressure-fed using high-pressure helium storage to replace the expense and complexity of turbopumps. All of the BA-2 propellant tanks and primary structures were to be manufactured from lightweight composite materials. The engines were self-cooled with ablative materials.

Subsequent history
After the dissolution of Beal Aerospace, its McGregor, Texas test site was acquired by SpaceX to become its McGregor test site in late 2002.

See also
 List of private spaceflight companies - A compiled list of private spaceflight companies

References

 Associated Press, Aerospace company failed to get the needed U.S. approval for Guyana launches, 23 July 1999

External links
 Homepage: Beal Aerospace
 Encyclopedia Astronautica, Beal Aerospace

Private spaceflight companies
Space companies in the Dallas–Fort Worth metroplex
Defunct companies based in Texas
Defunct spaceflight companies